The Eritrean National Time Trial Championships are held annually to decide the cycling champions in the individual time trial discipline, across various categories.

Men

Elite

U23

Women

See also
Eritrean National Road Race Championships
National road cycling championships

References

National road cycling championships
Cycle races in Eritrea